Ballycogley is a large townland located 8 miles from Wexford town, in Ireland. It plays host to one of Europe's highest water towers, as well as a proposed wind farm. The townland social life revolves around the two pubs - the Halfway House and the Hitching Post.

Ballycogley has been a haven for devotees of heavy metal and rock over the years. In the late eighties and early nineties, it was the host of several 'biker' festivals and events. In recent years, the Halfway House has become a regular venue for local rock bands, and many a musician's career has begun in Ballycogley.

Notable Figures 
 Luke Wadding, Bishop of Ferns was born in Ballcogley Castle in the 1628. He related to the more well-known Friar Luke Wadding, and predecessor to the bishopric of Ferns, Nicholas French.

References

Townlands of County Wexford